The 2006 NHK Trophy was the final event of six in the 2006–07 ISU Grand Prix of Figure Skating, a senior-level international invitational competition series. It was held at the Big Hat in Nagano on November 30 – December 3. Medals were awarded in the disciplines of men's singles, ladies' singles, pair skating, and ice dancing. Skaters earned points toward qualifying for the 2006–07 Grand Prix Final.

Results

Men

Ladies
Mao Asada (JPN) set a world record for the combined overall total (199.52) in ladies' singles.

Pairs

Ice dancing
Fourth-place finishers Meryl Davis / Charlie White (USA) made history in their free dance by earning level fours (the highest level of difficulty of an element) for all their elements in that dance. This was the first time a dance team has earned all level fours.

External links
 2006 Competition
 2006 NHK Trophy - Official Site

Nhk Trophy, 2006
NHK Trophy